Yvonne Tobis (איבונה טוביס; born February 5, 1948) is an Israeli former Olympic swimmer.

Early life
Tobis was born in Bratislava, Czechoslovakia, and is Jewish. She attended Millfield in Street, Somerset, England, from 1963-66, and is in its Hall of Fame.

Swimming career
At the 1965 Maccabiah Games in Israel, at 17 years of age, Tobis won a gold medal in the 400 m individual medley. 

Tobis won a silver medal representing Israel at the 1966 Asian Games in the 200 metre medley, and a bronze medal in 100 metre freestyle.

When she competed in the Olympics she was 5-6.5 (170 cm) tall, and weighed 152 lbs (69 kg).

Tobis competed for Israel at the 1968 Summer Olympics in Mexico City, Mexico, at the age of 20 in swimming.  In the Women's 100 metre Butterfly she finished 3rd in Heat 3 in a time of 1:12.0, in the Women's 200 metre Individual Medley she finished 4th in heat 1 in a time of 2:41.0, and in the Women's 400 metre Individual Medley she finished 6th in heat 4 in a time of 5:53.8.

References

External links
 

1948 births
Living people
Israeli female swimmers
Swimmers at the 1968 Summer Olympics
Olympic swimmers of Israel
Sportspeople from Bratislava
Czech female swimmers
Czechoslovak Jews
Israeli Jews
Jewish swimmers
Jewish Israeli sportspeople
Competitors at the 1965 Maccabiah Games
Maccabiah Games gold medalists for Israel
Maccabiah Games medalists in swimming
Asian Games medalists in swimming
Asian Games silver medalists for Israel
Asian Games bronze medalists for Israel
Swimmers at the 1966 Asian Games
Medalists at the 1966 Asian Games
People educated at Millfield